Michael Cleary (born 16 August 1966) is a former Irish sportsperson. He played hurling with his local club Nenagh Éire Óg and with the Tipperary senior inter-county team in the 1980s and 1990s.

Early life
Michael Cleary was born in Nenagh, County Tipperary in 1966.  He is the only son of Peg and James Cleary, he was educated locally and later worked in the family newsagent and restaurant. He has two sisters.

Playing career

Club
Cleary played his club hurling with his local Nenagh Éire Óg club and enjoyed much success.  In the 1980s he won under-16 and under-21 county medals with the club, as well as North Tipperary, county junior medals and a senior League Division medal.  In 1995 Cleary won his only senior county title. Nenagh reached the Munster club final in that year but lost to Sixmilebridge of Clare.

Inter-county
Cleary first came to prominence as a member of the Tipperary minor hurling team in the early 1980s.  He won a Munster title in this grade in 1983, however, there was no subsequent All-Ireland title.  Cleary later played on the county's under-21 team, however, he had little success at this grade.  He subsequently joined the Tipp senior team and made his debut in 1988 in a National Hurling League game against Waterford.  The following year Cleary had his first major success when he won his first senior Munster title.  Tipp later went on to defeat surprise finalists Antrim in the championship decider, giving Cleary his first All-Ireland medal.  Tipperary sensationally lost their Munster crown to Cork in 1990, however, the team returned in 1991 and Cleary collected his second Munster medal.  His team later defeated Kilkenny, giving Cleary a second All-Ireland medal. Cleary was the leading scorer in the senior hurling championship in 1991. Tipp surrendered their Munster title to Cork again in 1992, however, the team bounced back in 1993 and Cleary added a third Munster medal to his collection.  Cleary later had the honour of leading his team against Galway in the subsequent All-Ireland semi-final, however, the Munster men were defeated on that occasion.  Cleary won a National Hurling League medal in 1994, however, Tipperary's hurling fortunes in the championship started to take a downturn.  Cleary's side lost the 1997 Munster final to Clare, however, the two sides later met in the All-Ireland final due to the introduction of the 'back-door system.'  Tipp lost by a single point that day and Cleary retired from inter-county hurling shortly afterwards.

Cleary's other honours include four consecutive All-Star awards between 1990 and 1993.

Management
Michael also coached the Tipperary Camogie Team to their first All-Ireland championship in 1999 and to two further All-Ireland's in 2000 and 2001 completing an historic three-in-a-row.

Honours

Team
Tipperary
All-Ireland Senior Hurling Championship (2): 1989, 1991
Munster Senior Hurling Championship (4): 1988, 1989, 1991, 1993
National Hurling League (2): 1987–88, 1993–94

Nenagh Éire Óg
Tipperary Senior Hurling Championship (1): 1995

Munster
Railway Cup (1): 1992

Individual

Awards
All-Star (4): 1990, 1991, 1992, 1993
All-Ireland Senior Hurling Championship Top Scorer (1): 1991

References

1966 births
Living people
Tipperary inter-county hurlers
Nenagh Éire Óg hurlers
Munster inter-provincial hurlers